Valley Township is a township in Pottawattamie County, Iowa, USA.

History
Valley Township is named from its setting in the Nishnabotna Valley.

References

Townships in Pottawattamie County, Iowa
Townships in Iowa